Marlene Mevong Mba (born 29 April 1990) is an Equatoguinean sprinter. She competed in the 100 metres at the 2015 World Championships in Beijing without advancing from the first round.

International competitions

Personal bests
Outdoor
100 metres – 12.35 (+1.8 m/s, Barcelona 2015)
200 metres – 25.26 (+0.2 m/s, Zaragoza 2013)
Indoor
60 metres – 7.99 (Zaragoza 2008)
200 metres – 25.85 (San Sebastián 2008)

References

External links

1990 births
Living people
Equatoguinean female sprinters
World Athletics Championships athletes for Equatorial Guinea
Place of birth missing (living people)